9500 Liberty is a 2009 documentary film about the struggle over immigration in Prince William County, Virginia. It was directed by Annabel Park and Eric Byler.

Content

The film chronicles an eight-week period wherein an "Arizona-style" immigration crackdown was implemented and quickly repealed. 9500 Liberty began as an "interactive documentary," allowing its viewers to not only comment, but to help determine direction and additional coverage of the story, which was uploaded to a YouTube channel as footage was shot. These videos were combined with additional unreleased footage (including the directors' attempts at citizen journalism and civic duty amidst an antagonistic climate) to create the documentary.

Release and Reception

9500 Liberty garnered four film festival awards, and was released theatrically in select cities; it was picked up by MTV Networks for a Sept. 26, 2010 cable premiere.

References

Further reading

External links
 9500 Liberty website
 

2009 films
2009 documentary films
American documentary films
Documentary films about immigration to the United States
Films scored by Michael Brook
Films set in Virginia
Films shot in Virginia
Prince William County, Virginia
2000s English-language films
2000s American films